Roridomyces subglobosus is a species of fungus in the genus Roridomyces, family Mycenaceae.

Taxonomy
The species was first described as Marasmius subglobosus by Miles Joseph Berkeley and Moses Ashley Curtis in 1869. German mycologist Otto Kuntze transferred it to the genus Chamaeceras in 1898, and Daniel Pegler proposed the combination Mycena subglobosus in a 1987 publication.

References

External links

Mycenaceae
Fungi described in 1869
Taxa named by Miles Joseph Berkeley